RV  MTA Oruç Reis is a Turkish research vessel owned by the General Directorate of Mineral Research and Exploration (MTA) in Ankara and operated by its division of Geophysical Directorate for subsea geophysical exploration in shallow waters.

Characteristics
The building of MTA Oruç Reis was contracted by the MTA to Istanbul Maritime Shipyard in Tuzla, Istanbul on April 24, 2012. She was launched on March 28, 2015, and was named for Oruç Reis (c. 1474–1518), the Ottoman Beylerbeyi of the West Mediterranean. She is propelled by four  12V diesel generators of Anglo Belgian Corporation (ABC). The number of the crew is 27 and the scientific staff aboard is 28.

Following the completion of tests and acceptance activities in April 2017, she will be commissioned to explore petroleum in the Mediterranean Sea. Additional equipment allows survey of ocean current and analysis of physical, chemical and biological properties with the help of a CTD device for conductivity, temperature and depth. The vessel features a  12 t-capacity helipad for a helicopter suitable for day/night landing and take off.

Controversies 
On August 13, 2020, Turkish President Recep Tayyip Erdoğan announced that any attack on Oruç Reis will incur a "high price" and suggested that Turkey had already acted on that warning. This comes after unconfirmed reports that the Hellenic Navy frigate  collided with one of the ships of the Turkish Navy that were escorting Oruç Reis, which resumed drilling operations near Kastellorizo on August 10 after suspending its work in July.

See also

List of research vessels of Turkey

References

Ships built in Istanbul
2015 ships
Research vessels of Turkey